Sea Lion is the second full-length album released by the New Zealand-based band The Ruby Suns, and their first since signing to US label Sub Pop.

Track listing

Release details

References

External links
Lil' Chief Records: The Ruby Suns
Lil' Chief Records
The Ruby Suns on MySpace

2008 albums
The Ruby Suns albums
Lil' Chief Records albums
Memphis Industries albums
Sub Pop albums